Kamrup College is an undergraduate college established in the year 1966 at Chamata of Nalbari district in Assam. The college is affiliated to Gauhati University.

Departments
 Assamese
 Arabic
 English
 Economics
 Education
 Mathematics
 Philosophy
 Political Science
 Sanskrit

Accreditation
In 2016 the college has been awarded "A" grade with CGPA 3.04 by National Assessment and Accreditation Council. The college is also recognised by University Grants Commission (India).

References

External links

Colleges affiliated to Gauhati University
Universities and colleges in Assam
1966 establishments in Assam
Educational institutions established in 1966
Education in Nalbari district